Roberto Puķītis (born 16 December 1994, in Ventspils) is a Latvian male short track speed skater.

References

External links
Roberto Puķītis's profile, from http://www.sochi2014.com; retrieved 2014-02-11.

1994 births
Living people
Latvian male short track speed skaters
Olympic short track speed skaters of Latvia
Short track speed skaters at the 2014 Winter Olympics
Short track speed skaters at the 2018 Winter Olympics
People from Ventspils
21st-century Latvian people